Red Sea Crossing is a Christian video game for the Atari 2600. The game has only two copies known to exist, making it one of the rarest video games in existence.

Description 
The game begins with Moses parting the Red Sea, with the goal of reaching the Sinai Peninsula. The player, taking on the role of Moses, then attempts to dodge various underwater obstacles such as seaweed and giant clams, as well as pursuing Egyptians. When killed the Red Sea closes.  

The game was published independently in 1983 and sold exclusively through advertisements in Christianity Today.

Rarity 
Only two copies are known to exist. One copy was sold in 2012 for $10,400.

See also 
 Christian media

References

External links 
https://www.youtube.com/watch?v=avR62MKEwyw - Youtube video of gameplay

Atari 2600 games
Atari 2600-only games
Christian video games
Cultural depictions of Moses
Video games about religion
Video game culture
1983 video games
Video games developed in the United States
Atari 2600 homebrew games
Video games set in Egypt
Book of Exodus
Single-player video games